The Samajbadi Party, Nepal, abbr. SPN was the third-largest political party in Nepal party after the Nepali Congress and the Nepal Communist Party. It was formed on 6 May 2019 by the merger of the Federal Socialist Forum, Nepal, led by Deputy Prime Minister Upendra Yadav, and the Naya Shakti Party, Nepal, led by former Prime Minister Baburam Bhattarai. The party was founded with the ideology of democratic socialism and ethnic federalism. It uses the flag and election symbol of the Federal Socialist Forum, Nepal.

On 23 April 2020, the party merged with Rastriya Janata Party Nepal to form Janata Samajwadi Party, Nepal.

Leadership 

Chairman of Federal Council: Baburam Bhattarai

Chairman of Central Committee: Upendra Yadav

Senior Leader: Ashok Rai

Co-Chairman: Rajendra Prasad Shrestha
Vice-Chairmen (8): Navaraj Subedi, Parshuram Khapung, Yuvaraj Karki, Rakam Chemjong, Renu Kumari Yadav, Lal Babu Raut, Hisila Yami, and Hem Raj Rai.
General secretaries (3): Ganga Narayan Shrestha, Rana Dhwaj Kandangba, and Ram Sahay Prasad Yadav
Deputy General secretaries (3): Dambar Khatiwada, Dan Bahadur Bishwokarma, and Prakash Adhikari
Secretaries (6): Mohammad Istiyak Rai, Durga Sob, Parshuram Basnet, and Prashant Singh. Two vacant. 
Treasurer: Bijay Kumar Yadav

Presence in the Federal Parliament

Presence in various provinces 
Before the merger Federal Socialist Forum, Nepal was represented in the provincial assemblies in Province No. 1, Province No. 2 and Lumbini Province, whereas Naya Shakti Party, Nepal was represented in Bagmati Province and Gandaki Province. This list is a combination of both parties.

See also
 List of political parties in Nepal
 Madhesi Jana Adhikar Forum, Nepal
 Federal Socialist Forum, Nepal
 Naya Shakti Party, Nepal

References

2019 establishments in Nepal
Democratic socialist parties in Asia
Federalist parties in Nepal
Political parties established in 2019
2020 disestablishments in Nepal
Political parties disestablished in 2020
Defunct socialist parties in Nepal